Lilfordia School (or Lilfordia) is an independent, preparatory, boarding school for boys and girls in Mashonaland West, Zimbabwe. Lilfordia was established in 1909 by Agnes and Atherton Lilford. The school is notable for the producing talented cricketers such as Brendan Taylor and Trevor Madondo.

Lilfordia School is a member of the Association of Trust Schools and the Headmaster is a member of the Conference of Heads of Independent Schools in Zimbabwe.

History

In 1909, Agnes and Atherton Lilford opened Lilfordia School and a lodging establishment for people living in Salisbury (now Harare) on their farm in order to supplement their income as the Lilfords were struggling financially. As the school grew the lodge was closed. Lilfordia became "government approved" in the 1920s.

Sports
Sports offered at Lilfordia include:

Notable alumni
 Alistair Campbell, Zimbabwean cricketer
 Donald Campbell, Zimbabwean cricketer 
 Douglas Lilford, Rhodesian/Zimbabwean farmer and politician
 Trevor Madondo, Zimbabwean cricketer 
 Brendan Taylor, Zimbabwean cricketer 
 Malcolm Waller, Zimbabwean cricketer
 Oliver Lilford, PhB student at the ANU
 Ryan Arnott, GBP Banbury Manager

See also

 List of schools in Zimbabwe

References

External links
  Official website
  on the ATS website
  on Facebook

Private schools in Zimbabwe
Boarding schools in Zimbabwe
Co-educational schools in Zimbabwe
Educational institutions established in 1909
Member schools of the Association of Trust Schools
1909 establishments in the British Empire